Sutbuk (Dargwa: СутбукӀ) is a rural locality (a selo) and the administrative centre of Sutbuksky Selsoviet, Dakhadayevsky District, Republic of Dagestan, Russia. The population was 285 as of 2010. There are 4 streets.

Geography
Sutbuk is located 30 km southwest of Urkarakh (the district's administrative centre) by road. Urtsaki and Uragi are the nearest rural localities.

Nationalities 
Dargins live there.

References 

Rural localities in Dakhadayevsky District